Cuyahoga Falls High School (CFHS) is a public high school in Cuyahoga Falls, Ohio, United States. It is the only high school in the Cuyahoga Falls City School District. It has a current enrollment of around 1,663 students in grades 9–12. The school's athletic teams are known as the Black Tigers and compete in the Suburban League.

The high school is also part of the Six District Educational Compact, a joint program of six area school districts (Cuyahoga Falls, Hudson, Kent, Stow-Munroe Falls, Tallmadge and Woodridge) to share access to each of their vocational training facilities and career resources.

Clubs and activities
Cuyahoga Falls High School has a Latin Club which functions as a local chapter of both the Ohio Junior Classical League (OJCL) and National Junior Classical League (NJCL).  Other CFHS clubs include Academic Challenge (Ohio), National Honor Society, Art Club, Project Love, Book Club, Science Olympiad, Chess Club, Ski Club, DECA, Spanish Club, German Club, French Club, spring musical, fall play, Stage Crew, the M&M's and New Horizons Vocal Jazz groups, the Cuyahoga Falls High School Jazz Ensemble, Gold Tones Jazz Ensemble, and the Cuyahoga Falls Marching Tiger Band.

State championships

 Girls Softball – 1980

Notable alumni
 Jim Ballard, former professional football player in the National Football League (NFL)
 Robert Berdella, serial killer
 Scotty Bierce, former NFL player
 Jim Boeke, former NFL player
 Dain Clay, professional baseball player for the Cincinnati Reds of Major League Baseball from 1943 to 1946
 Jim Jarmusch, independent film director
 Albert Kingsbury, inventor and engineer
 Bill Lund, former NFL player
 Michael Morell, acting director of the Central Intelligence Agency from 2012 to 2013

Notes and references

High schools in Summit County, Ohio
Public high schools in Ohio
Cuyahoga Falls, Ohio